The 2016–17 Detroit Red Wings season was the 91st season for the National Hockey League (NHL) franchise that was established on September 25, 1926. It was the Red Wings' final season at Joe Louis Arena before their move to Little Caesars Arena for the 2017–18 season. This season also marked the end of the Red Wings playoff streak at 25 consecutive seasons, and was their first losing season since 1990–91.

Off-season
On May 10, 2016, the Red Wings named Doug Houda as an assistant coach.

On May 17, 2016, the Red Wings named Jeff Salajko as their new goaltending coach, replacing long-time former coach Jim Bedard.

On June 9, 2016, the Red Wings named John Torchetti as an assistant coach.

On September 16, 2016, the Red Wings named Shawn Horcoff director of player development.

Standings

Schedule and results

Pre-season

Regular season

Player statistics

Skaters

Goaltenders

†Denotes player spent time with another team before joining the Red Wings. Stats reflect time with the Red Wings only.
‡Traded mid-season
Bold/italics denotes franchise record

Awards and honours

Awards

Milestones

Suspensions/fines

Transactions

Trades

Notes
Detroit to retain 50% ($1.3 million) of salary as part of trade.

Free agents acquired

Free agents lost

Claimed via waivers

Lost via waivers

Lost via retirement

Player signings

Draft picks

Below are the Detroit Red Wings' selections at the 2016 NHL Entry Draft, held on June 24–25, 2016 at the First Niagara Center in Buffalo, New York.

Draft notes

 The Detroit Red Wings' first-round pick went to the Arizona Coyotes as the result of a trade on June 24, 2016 that sent Joe Vitale, the Rangers' first-round pick and a compensatory second-round pick both in 2016 (20th and 53rd overall) to Detroit in exchange for Pavel Datsyuk and this pick.
 The New York Rangers' first-round pick went to the Detroit Red Wings as the result of a trade on June 24, 2016 that sent Pavel Datsyuk and a first-round pick in 2016 (16th overall) to Arizona in exchange for Joe Vitale, a compensatory second-round pick in 2016 (53rd overall) and this pick.
Arizona previously acquired this pick as the result of a trade on March 1, 2015 that sent Keith Yandle, Chris Summers and a fourth-round pick in 2016 to New York in exchange for John Moore, Anthony Duclair, Tampa Bay's second-round pick in 2015 and this pick (being conditional at the time of the trade). The condition – Arizona will receive a first-round pick in 2016 if New York qualifies for the 2016 Stanley Cup playoffs – was converted on April 4, 2016.

 The Arizona Coyotes' compensatory second-round pick (53rd overall) went to the Detroit Red Wings as the result of a trade on June 24, 2016 that sent Pavel Datsyuk and a first-round pick in 2016 (16th overall) to Arizona in exchange for Joe Vitale, the Rangers' first-round pick in 2016 (20th overall) and this pick.
Arizona previously received this pick as compensation for not signing 2014 first-round draft pick Conner Bleackley, whom they acquired in an earlier trade with Colorado.

 The Detroit Red Wings' third-round pick went to the Pittsburgh Penguins as the result of a trade on June 25, 2016 that sent Beau Bennett to New Jersey in exchange for this pick.
New Jersey previously acquired this pick as the result of a trade on March 2, 2015 that sent Marek Zidlicky to Detroit in exchange for a conditional fifth-round pick in 2015 and this pick (being conditional at the time of the trade). The condition – New Jersey will receive a third-round pick in 2016 if Detroit does not advance to the 2015 Stanley Cup Finals – was converted on April 29, 2015 when Detroit was eliminated from the 2015 Stanley Cup playoffs.

References

Detroit Red Wings seasons
Detroit Red Wings
Detroit Red
Detroit Red